Katie Sowers (born August 7, 1986) is an American football coach in the National Football League. She was the first openly gay and first female coach in Super Bowl history. Sowers began her American football career playing in the Women's Football Alliance. She joined the NFL in 2016 as a coach for the Atlanta Falcons and then with the San Francisco 49ers, before joining the Kansas City Chiefs in 2021. Sowers currently works in the athletic department of Ottawa University.

Early life and education
Sowers was born on August 7, 1986, in Hesston, Kansas, where she attended a Mennonite church with her family. She began playing American football at the age of eight. Sowers attended Hesston College, Goshen College and the University of Central Missouri. Sowers graduated from Central Missouri with a master's degree in kinesiology in 2012.

Career

Playing career
While a student at Goshen, Sowers began her football career playing for the West Michigan Mayhem and the Kansas City Titans in the Women's Football Alliance. While with the Titans, Sowers was a member of the United States women's national American football team that won the 2013 IFAF Women's World Championship. Sowers continued to play in the WFA until her 2016 retirement due to a hip injury.

Coaching career
In 2016, Sowers joined the National Football League as a wide receivers coaching intern with the Atlanta Falcons. In 2017, Sowers moved to the San Francisco 49ers as part of the Bill Walsh Diversity Coaching Fellowship. She became a seasonal intern before being converted to full-time offensive assistant. In her first season, the 49ers won the NFC Championship, sending the team to Super Bowl LIV and allowing Sowers to become the first female and first openly gay coach in a Super Bowl. Her contract with the 49ers expired after the 2020 season. She joined the coaching staff of the Kansas City Chiefs prior to the 2021 NFL season. In October 2021, Sowers was appointed as the director of athletic strategic initiatives at Ottawa University, where she also coaches the women's flag football team.

Personal life
Before the start of the 2017 NFL season, Sowers came out publicly as a lesbian and became the first openly LGBT coach in the National Football League. Sowers was refused a volunteer coaching position at Goshen College in 2009 because of her sexual orientation. In 2020 the president of the college apologized for rejecting her.

Sowers' twin sister, Liz, plays football as a wide receiver.

References

External links
San Francisco 49ers coach profile 

American LGBT sportspeople
LGBT people from Kansas
People from Harvey County, Kansas
San Francisco 49ers coaches
University of Central Missouri alumni
1986 births
Living people
Lesbian sportswomen
Female players of American football
Goshen College alumni
Hesston College alumni
People from Kansas
Female coaches of American football
American Mennonites
LGBT Mennonites